Zabork is a dispersed settlement in the hills north of Stranice in the Municipality of Zreče in northeastern Slovenia. The area is part of the traditional region of Styria. It is now included with the rest of the municipality in the Savinja Statistical Region.

History
The hamlet of Zabork (in some sources, Zaburk) was administratively separated from Stranice in 1998 and made a settlement in its own right.

References

External links
Zabork at Geopedia

Populated places in the Municipality of Zreče